Lee Yvonne (born 22 October 1988, Selangor, Malaysia) is a Malaysian Chinese master of ceremonies. She is best known for her title as Miss World Malaysia 2012 / 2013 and represented her country in the Miss World 2012 in Ordos, Inner Mongolia, China PR.

Personal life
Yvonne holds B.A. in Mass Communication from KDU University College

Career

Pageantry and modeling
She started modeling at the age of 20 and since then has appeared in magazines such as Seventeen Magazine, FEMALE, Cleo, Cosmopolitan, MYC!, Sisters, Her World, Celebrities Media, FACES, Clive and Esquire.  She has also appeared on the cover of Asia Bar Culture, KL Lifestyle magazine, Ezy Trader magazine and also Hypertune magazine. Yvonne starred in a local music video and won the title of Miss Veet 2008. The event has been described by organizers as encouraging contestants to have "confidence in displaying their smooth legs."

At the age of 21, Yvonne was crowned as Miss Malaysia Tourism Metropolitan 2009. Yvonne ventured full-time into emceeing at the end of year 2011 and she has hosted events for BMW, Petronas, Motorola, Kodak, Pandora, Proton, Genting, KPMG, Hyundai and Banana Republic.

In 2012, she won the Miss World Malaysia title beating sixteen other women around the country. Yvonne represented Malaysia at Miss World 2012 in Ordos, Inner Mongolia, China PR on August 18, 2012, but failed to place among the top sixteen semifinalists.

Television career
Yvonne participated on a reality-hosting program called Projek 3R and won with two other contestants to host 3R on TV3. In 2016, Lee competed in the fifth season of The Amazing Race Asia with Chloe Chen.

Filmography

Television

References

1988 births
Living people
People from Selangor
Malaysian people of Chinese descent
Malaysian beauty pageant winners
Malaysian television personalities
Miss World 2012 delegates
Malaysian female models
The Amazing Race contestants